This is a list of notable proto-punk artists and bands.

List

? and the Mysterians
The 101ers
 The 13th Floor Elevators
Alice Cooper
 Amboy Dukes
The Bad Seeds
The Beatles
Blue Cheer
Brinsley Schwarz
Can
Captain Beefheart and His Magic Band
The Chocolate Watchband
The Count Bishops
Count Five
Crushed Butler
David Bowie
Death
Destroy All Monsters
The Deviants
The Dictators
Doctors of Madness
The Dogs
Dr. Feelgood

The Droogs
 The Doors
 Ton Steine Scherben
Ducks Deluxe
Eddie and the Hot Rods
Edgar Broughton Band
Electric Eels
Evil
Figures of Light
Flamin' Groovies
The Fugs
The Gorillas
Hawkwind
The Hangmen
The Haunted
The Hollywood Brats
John's Children
Kilburn and the High Roads
The Kingsmen
The Kinks
Nick Lowe
MC5
Mirrors
The Modern Lovers

The Monks
The Moving Sidewalks
The Mothers Of Invention
The Music Machine
Neu!
New York Dolls
The Night Walkers
John Otway & Wild Willy Barrett
David Peel 
Pink Fairies
The Punks
Paul Revere & The Raiders
Red Krayola
Rocket from the Tombs
The Rolling Stones
Roxy Music
 Los Saicos
Sam the Sham & the Pharaohs
The Seeds
The Shadows of Knight
Shagrat 
Simply Saucer

Patti Smith
The Sonics
The Spiders from Mars
Stack Waddy
The Standells
The Stooges
The Stranglers
The Styrenes
Sleepy Sleepers
Suicide
T. Rex
Television
 Them
Third World War
The Troggs
The Trashmen
The Tubes
The Up
The Velvet Underground
The Wailers
 The Who
 Link Wray
Zakary Thaks
Zolar X

References

Proto-punk